The A34 is a major metropolitan arterial route in Sydney. It runs parallel to the tolled M5 Motorway.

The name "A34" is the route allocation for the route as a whole, not a road name. The A34 route runs along a series of roads with different names. From west to east they are:
 Macquarie Street
 Terminus Street
 Newbridge Road
 Milperra Road
 Canterbury Road
 New Canterbury Road
 Stanmore Road
 Enmore Road

Route
From here, the A34 is called Newbridge Road until crossing the Georges River when Milperra Road starts. Canterbury Road then splits off into Old Canterbury Road and New Canterbury Road where A34 continues onto the new one.

History
The route was originally designated State Route 54 in 1974, terminating at the intersection of Enmore Road and King Street as it is currently. In 1993, the State Route was extended through Newtown along King Street and City Road, after the National Route 1 route designation was removed from the two roads (the National Route 1 was realigned via the current M1/A1 alignment). As a result, the State Route then terminated at Broadway at its eastern end.

With the conversion to the newer alphanumeric system in 2013, the State Route designation was replaced with route A34, and the eastern end was truncated back to the intersection of Enmore Road and King Street, in front of Newtown station. The truncated section was instead replaced with route A36 (for Princes Highway).

See also

References

External Links
A34 on Ozroads

Sydney Metroads